Llandeilo'r-Fan is a small village located in Powys, Wales. It is located between Llandovery and Brecon. It is very rural and is located in a hilly area of mid wales. The village has a church, community hall and a few houses. The nearest shop and pub are in Sennybridge.

References
Genuki: Llandeilo'r fân / Llandeilo-arfan / Llandilor-fane, Breconshire
Llandeilo'r-Fan, Powys - Powys - area information, map, walks and more
LLANDEILO'R-FAN | Coflein
https://forebears.io/wales/brecknockshire/llandeilor-fan

Churches

Villages in Powys